Molybdenum cofactor sulfurtransferase (molybdenum cofactor sulfurase, ABA3,  MoCo sulfurase, MoCo sulfurtransferase) is an enzyme with systematic name L-cysteine:molybdenum cofactor sulfurtransferase. This enzyme catalyses the following chemical reaction

 molybdenum cofactor + L-cysteine + 2 H+  thio-molybdenum cofactor + L-alanine + H2O

This enzyme contains pyridoxal phosphate.

References

External links 
 

EC 2.8.1